Vest Township is an inactive township in Scotland County, in the U.S. state of Missouri.

Vest Township was erected in 1891, taking its name from George Graham Vest, a United States Senator from Missouri.

References

Townships in Missouri
Townships in Scotland County, Missouri